The Governor-General of Nigeria was the representative of the monarch of the United Kingdom in Colonial Nigeria from 1954 to 1960, and after Nigerian independence in 1960, the representative of the Nigerian head of state.

The office was created on 1 October 1954, when the Colony and Protectorate of Nigeria was created an autonomous federation within the British Empire. After independence in 1960, the Governor-General became the representative of the Nigerian monarch, and the office continued to exist till 1963, when Nigeria abolished its monarchy, and became a republic.

This article contains a list of Governors and Governors-General of the Colony and Protectorate of Nigeria, and later of the Federation of Nigeria; both as a British overseas possession and an independent monarchy.

Governor-general of Nigeria, 1914–1919

Governors of Nigeria, 1919–1954

Governors-general of Nigeria, 1954–1963
Following is a list of people who have served as Governor-General of Nigeria.

Flag of the Governor-General

See also
List of heads of state of Nigeria
Lists of office-holders

References

External links
 Nigerian heads of state at WorldStatesmen.org
 Nigerian heads of state at rulers.org

 
Nigeria, List of Governors-General of
Governors-General
Nigeria